Marlingford and Colton, formerly Marlingford is a civil parish in the English county of Norfolk, made from the villages of Colton and Marlingford.
For the purposes of local government, it falls within the district of South Norfolk.

History 
The parish of Colton was merged with Marlingford on 1 April 1935. In 2001 the parish was renamed from "Marlingford" to "Marlingford and Colton".

Notes

External links

Civil parishes in Norfolk
South Norfolk